Northamptonshire County Council was the county council that governed the non-metropolitan county of Northamptonshire in England. It was originally formed in 1889 by the Local Government Act 1888, recreated in 1974 by the Local Government Act 1972 and abolished in 2021. The headquarters of the council was County Hall in Northampton.

As a non-metropolitan county council, the council was responsible for education, social services, libraries, main roads, public transport policy and fire services, trading standards, waste disposal and strategic planning.

In early 2018, the Council announced it was effectively insolvent. Subsequently, a report by Government Inspectors concluded that problems at the council were so deep-rooted that it should be abolished and replaced by two smaller authorities.

In February 2020, the Northamptonshire (Structural Changes) Order 2020 was enacted, which on 1 April 2021 abolished Northamptonshire County Council and the district councils and created two unitary district councils, known as 'North Northamptonshire Council' and 'West Northamptonshire Council'.

History
Northamptonshire County Council was first formed in 1889 as a result of the Local Government Act 1888, covering Northamptonshire, with the exceptions of the borough of Northampton, which became a county borough and the Soke of Peterborough, which was made its own administrative county. This arrangement changed in 1974 when, following the Local Government Act 1972, a newly constituted Northamptonshire County Council was formed for the non-metropolitan county of Northamptonshire. First elections to the new authority were in April 1973, and the council took office on 1 April 1974.

From its recreation in 1974, the county council administered the newly formed non-metropolitan county of Northamptonshire, including Northampton. This did not include the area of the Soke of Peterborough (now part of Cambridgeshire). During 1990s local government reform, Northampton tried to obtain unitary authority status, but failed. Between 1974 and 2021, there were three tiers of local government: the county council; seven lower-tier councils, comprising four borough councils (Corby, Kettering, Northampton, Wellingborough) and three district councils (Daventry, East Northamptonshire, South Northamptonshire); and more than 250 parish councils.

Governance
Northamptonshire County Council operated executive arrangements in the form of a Leader and Cabinet system from 2001. In December 2008, the council chose to adopt the revised Executive Leader and Cabinet arrangement.

The Council was composed of 57 councillors, each representing a single-member division. Elections were held every four years; the last in 2017.

Cabinet
Northamptonshire County Council's cabinet was composed of seven councillors and the Leader of the council.

Districts and boroughs 

Between 1974 and 2021, Northamptonshire had three tiers of local government: the county council, seven district or borough councils, and over 200 parish councils. The seven district councils were:
 Corby Borough Council
 Daventry District Council
 East Northamptonshire District Council
 Kettering Borough Council
 Northampton Borough Council
 South Northamptonshire District Council
 Borough Council of Wellingborough

These district councils were responsible for local planning and building control, local roads, council housing, environmental health, markets and fairs, refuse collection and recycling, cemeteries and crematoria, leisure services, parks, and tourism.

Political control 

Political control of the county council was held by the following groups:

At abolition, the council comprised 57 councillors. Each councillor typically served for a four-year term, representing an electoral division. Each electoral division elected one councillor by the first-past-the-post system of election. The composition of the county council, following the 2017 election, was 43 Conservative councillors, 12 Labour councillors, and 2 Liberal Democrat councillors.

Insolvency
Early in 2018 the county council announced that it "was effectively insolvent."

In March 2018, a government-appointed investigator's report into financial and management failures at the authority recommended the council be broken up. It said the problems at the council were so deep-rooted that it was impossible to rescue it in its current form, and to do so "would be a reward for failure". It recommended that ministers send in a team of external commissioners to take over the day-to-day running of the council until it can be broken up and replaced with two new smaller authorities. The report rejected the council leadership's claim that it had been disadvantaged by government funding cuts and underfunded. It condemned the council's attempt to restructure services by outsourcing them to private companies and charities (the Next Generation Programme). It described the council's budgeting as "an exercise of hope rather than expectation".

Subsequently, the council's Leader, Heather Smith, resigned. Robin Brown, Councillor with the finance brief was later sacked.

To save money, Northamptonshire Council was planning to cut services even for vulnerable people including vulnerable children. Austerity measures are blamed for the insolvency, as is the council's refusal to raise council tax despite the rising costs of providing social services. For half a decade the council used 'accounting ruses' and used financial services inappropriately. In future the council is to provide the legal minimum of services, focused on the most vulnerable—though it is unclear what the minimum will be, or how vulnerable people will be required to be to receive services. The council must find savings of £70m out of its £441m budget during the coming few months, and further savings of £54m during 2019-20.

Cuts were considered for children's services, adult services (investigating learning difficulties, fees, charges and National Health Service contributions), road maintenance and transport (including school buses), waste management, and culture; staff redundancies were also considered. There are to be planned widespread cuts to jobs and services, owing to a funding shortfall of £70m. Proposed cuts to Northamptonshire's library service were challenged in court. A judge reminded the councillors that they have a statutory duty to provide a comprehensive and efficient library service. The judge ruled that the council had not put enough time and effort into establishing whether the reduced service would meet their statutory duties, and ruled the cuts could not currently go ahead as proposed.  The cuts are causing hardship to some families with special needs.

Ofsted severely criticised what it saw as inadequate protection for at risk children, 267 young people were waiting up to four months for assessment and for a social worker.  Remedial action by management did not have 'sufficient urgency or rigour'.  Social workers responsible for child protection maintained they were, "overwhelmed" and "drowning" from pressure of increasing demand.  Some professionals were struggling with caseloads of between 30 and 50 children.  The council was not in a well placed to invest heavily in turning child protection services round as preventing bankruptcy is a major priority.

The budget cuts proposed in August 2018 were intended to save £70m from the £441m budget in 2018 and an additional £54m savings in 2019-20. As a result, the council expected to be able to provide only the "bare legal minimum of service, focused only on the most vulnerable residents ... No services will go unscathed, even in priority areas like child protection".

Some of the responsibility for the de facto bankruptcy (Section 114) of Northamptonshire must be accepted by the council, according to The Guardian which described "a reckless half-decade in which it refused to raise council tax to pay for the soaring costs of social care, preferring to patch up budget holes with accounting ruses and inappropriate use of financial reserves". Some observers, such as Simon Edwards of the County Councils Network, added another perspective on the cause of the financial crisis, discussing the United Kingdom government austerity programme. "It is clear that, partly due to past failings, the council is now having to make some drastic decisions to reduce services to a core offer. However, we can’t ignore that some of the underlying causes of the challenges facing Northamptonshire, such as dramatic reductions to council budgets and severe demand for services, mean county authorities across the country face funding pressures of £3.2bn over the next two years." Andrew Gwynne, the shadow secretary of state for communities and local government, provided this comment. "Government cuts are pushing our councils into crisis, and the crisis in Northamptonshire is the canary in the coal mine. Despite one of their own councils effectively declaring themselves bankrupt twice this year, we have yet to see [the] government recognise the appalling consequences of their austerity programme for people up and down the country". 

In January 2019 the Secretary of State for Housing, Communities and Local Government gave the council permission to raise its council tax by 5% in 2019–20 without the requirement for a local referendum.

Children's Services 
Between 2013 and 2016, the Council's children's services were in special measures after being rated as inadequate by Ofsted. In 2016, the service was updated to "requires improvement" and it was taken out of special measures.

In June 2019, the County's children's services were rated "inadequate" by Ofsted inspectors. The report found that there were "highly vulnerable children in care who are living in unregulated placements that are unsafe and unsuitable". Earlier in the same month, two serious case reviews found that council's child protection services had failed to protect two murdered children.

See also
2019 structural changes to local government in England

References

 
Former county councils of England
1889 establishments in England
2021 disestablishments in England
Local authorities in Northamptonshire